"Idfc" (abbreviation for "I Don't Fucking Care") is a song by American hip-hop recording artist blackbear. The song was released on October 16, 2014, as the first single from his first album, Deadroses (2015). It was written by Blackbear himself. The single was certified Double Platinum by the RIAA in March 2021.

Charts

Year-end charts

Certifications

References

2014 songs
2014 singles
Blackbear (musician) songs
Songs written by Blackbear (musician)